is  the former Head coach of the Ryukyu Golden Kings in the Japanese B.League. He spent his childhood in America for eight years.

Head coaching record

|-
| style="text-align:left;"|Ryukyu Golden Kings
| style="text-align:left;"|2017-18
| 60||42||18|||| style="text-align:center;"|1st in Western|||5||2||3||
| style="text-align:center;"|Lost in 2nd round
|-
| style="text-align:left;"|Ryukyu Golden Kings
| style="text-align:left;"|2018-19
| 60||40||20|||| style="text-align:center;"|1st in Western|||6||3||3||
| style="text-align:center;"|Lost in 2nd round
|-
| style="text-align:left;"|Ryukyu Golden Kings
| style="text-align:left;"|2019-20
| 20||13||7|||| style="text-align:center;"| fired|||-||-||-||
| style="text-align:center;"|-
|-

References

1984 births
Living people
Tokai University alumni
Utsunomiya Brex coaches
Japanese basketball coaches
Ryukyu Golden Kings coaches
Sun Rockers Shibuya coaches